The Kenny Everett Video Show (later renamed The Kenny Everett Video Cassette) was a British television comedy and music programme produced by Thames Television for the ITV network from 3 July 1978 to 21 May 1981.

This is a list of episodes including its four series and three Christmas / New Year specials. Dates listed are original airdates.

Series

Episodes

Series 1 (1978)
The first episode of The Kenny Everett Video Show aired at 6:45pm on Monday 3 July 1978. The eight-part series consisted mostly of musical performances, alongside Hot Gossip routines, Captain Kremmen cartoons, archive clips and occasional OB segments.

Series 2 (1979)
Prior to the second series, the programme returned on New Year's Day 1979 in most ITV regions (except Scottish Television, which aired the special on 7 January 1979) with the Didn't Quite Make it in Time for Christmas Video Show, which also aired in a shortened version on 18 April 1979 - as ITV's entry for the Golden Rose of Montreux.

Series Two began at 7:00pm on Monday 19 February 1979 with an extended ten-episode run (30 minutes per episode) and a greater reliance on comedy material.

Series 3 (1980)
The Video Show returned at 11:00pm on New Year's Eve 1979 with an hour-long special, Will Kenny Everett Make it to 1980? on most of the ITV network. Scottish Television aired it the following afternoon while Grampian Television opted out of the final part on its original transmission.

Series 3 ran for eight episodes, starting at 7:00pm on Monday 18 February 1980.

Series 4 (Video Cassette, 1981)
Everett's last New Year's special, The Kenny Everett New Year's Daze Show aired at 11:50pm on New Year's Eve 1980 over most of the ITV network. Ulster Television never aired this special, while Grampian and Scottish broadcast it two days later.

The final series, renamed The Kenny Everett Video Cassette, saw the show moved to Thursday evenings at 7:30pm in a bid to compete with BBC1's Top of the Pops. Unhappy with the scheduling of the series, among other issues, Everett left Thames and moved to BBC Television.

Specials

References

Lists of British non-fiction television series episodes
Lists of British comedy television series episodes